KesKus is a newspaper published in Estonia. The newspaper has been produced since 1999. The editor in chief is Juku-Kalle Raid.

References

1999 establishments in Estonia
Mass media in Tallinn
Newspapers published in Estonia
Publications established in 1999